Kevin Huppatz is a former Australian rules footballer who played with Collingwood in the Victorian Football League (VFL).

Notes

External links 

1945 births
Australian rules footballers from Victoria (Australia)
Collingwood Football Club players
Portland Football Club players
Living people